Herbert William Neate (26 April 1894 – 28 July 1956) was an Australian rules footballer who played with Essendon in the Victorian Football League (VFL).

Notes

External links 

1894 births
1956 deaths
Australian rules footballers from Melbourne
Essendon Football Club players
People from Carlton, Victoria